Amstelhoek is a village in the Dutch province of Utrecht. Amstelhoek lies on the river Amstel, directly across from Uithoorn.

It was first mentioned in 1936 as Amstelhoek, and means "corner of the Amstel river". It was named after the fortress. The village developed around a bridge built in 1636, and used to be named Mennonietenbuurt, meaning Mennonite corner, because a Mennonite church was built in the hamlet. The Mennonites left around 1800, and sold the land and church to the Protestants in 1804. The village was home to 187 people in 1840. Between 1885 and 1895, two big forts were built near the village as part of the Stelling van Amsterdam. One of the forts was named Fort bij Amstelhoek.

Gallery

References

Populated places in Utrecht (province)
De Ronde Venen